Caldanaerobius fijiensis is a thermophilic, obligately anaerobic and spore-forming bacterium from the genus of Caldanaerobius which has been isolated from a hot spring in Fiji.

References

 

Thermoanaerobacterales
Bacteria described in 2008
Thermophiles
Anaerobes